The Fujifilm XF1 is a digital compact camera announced by Fujifilm on September 17, 2012. It allows for full manual control, supports RAW, and at the time of its release competed with the Canon PowerShot S100 and Sony Cyber-shot RX100.

References

External links
Specifications

XF1
Live-preview digital cameras
Cameras introduced in 2012